| tries               = {{#expr:
 + 6
 + 8
 + 9
 + 4
 + 8
 + 2
}}
| top point scorer    = Ayumu Goromaru (Japan)36 points
| top try scorer      = Blaine Scully (United States)5 tries
| venue               = 
| attendance2         = 
| champions           = 
| count               = 
| runner-up           = 
| website             = IRB Pacific Nations Cup
| previous year       = 2013
| previous tournament = 2013 IRB Pacific Nations Cup
| next year           = 2015
| next tournament     = 2015 World Rugby Pacific Nations Cup
}}
The 2014 IRB Pacific Nations Cup, was the ninth edition of the IRB Pacific Nations Cup, the annual Tier 2 Rugby union tournament. Unlike previous competitions, the tournament was divided into two conferences of three teams each, with no interconference matches. Samoa emerged as the winner of the Pacific Islands conference title ahead of Fiji and Tonga, while Japan took out the Asia/Pacific conference remaining undefeated ahead of United States and Canada.

Format
Each team played each other once in their respective conferences, with no interconference matches. Four points were awarded for a win, two points for a draw and one point for a bonus point; the bonus point being awarded should a team score four or more tries in a match, or for a loss by seven points or less. The winner of each conferences was the team with the most log points, with tiebreakers being the head to-head results between teams equal on log points, followed points difference for-and-against.

As the three-week tournament coincided with the three-week June international window, players were able to be released from their clubs for their national teams. When a team was not in action in either conference, they played host to a touring Tier 1 nation from Europe. In Round 1, the United States hosted Scotland, while Fiji hosted Italy. In Round 2, Canada played Scotland, and Samoa played Italy. In Round 3, Japan hosted Italy and Tonga played a Pacific Barbarians side.

The full match schedule was announced on 9 April 2014.

Asia/Pacific conference

Table

Fixtures

Round 1

Notes:
 Gordon McRorie made his international debut for Canada.

Round 2

Round 3

Notes:
 Brett Thompson made his international debut for the United States.
 This was the United States first win over Canada in seven attempts. United States last won in July 2009.

Pacific Islands conference

Table

Fixtures

Round 1

Notes:
 Paul Ngauamo and Sonatane Takulua made their international debuts for Tonga.

Round 2

Notes
 Fijian winger, Sireli Bobo became the oldest player ever to represent Fiji when he ran onto the field at 38 years and 137 days old.

Round 3

Statistics

Points scorers

Try scorers

Squads

Note: Number of caps and players' ages are indicated as of 7 June 2014 – the tournament's opening day, pre first tournament match.

Canada
Canada's 27-man roster for the 2014 IRB Pacific Nations Cup.

On 19 June, Nathan Hirayama and Kyle Gilmour were added to the squad as further cover for their respective positions.

Fiji
Fiji 29-man squad for the 2014 IRB Pacific Nations Cup.

On 31 May, it was announced that Vereniki Goneva and Levani Botia were withdrawn from the squad due to injury. Watisoni Votu was added to the squad to replace Goneva, while Botia was not replaced.

Ahead of the final Round 3 match against Samoa, McKee added former footballer Isoa Donaldson to the squad to increase depth in the Fly Half position.

Japan
Japanese 28-man squad for the 2014 IRB Pacific Nations Cup.

Samoa
Samoa 31-man squad for the 2014 IRB Pacific Nations Cup.

On 19 June, Joe Tekori was added to the squad to cover the back row.

Tonga
Tonga's 29-man squad for the 2014 IRB Pacific Nations Cup.

United States
United States 40-man roster for the 2014 IRB Pacific Nations Cup. Caps are current as of June 1, 2014.

Note: Head coach Tolkin, will weekly reduce the squad to 28 for each test.

See also
 2014 mid-year rugby union tests
 2014 IRB Nations Cup
 2014 IRB Tbilisi Cup

References

External links
 IRB Pacific Nations Cup

2014
2014 rugby union tournaments for national teams
2014 in Oceanian rugby union
2014 in American rugby union
2014 in Canadian rugby union
2014 in Fijian rugby union
2013–14 in Japanese rugby union
2014 in Samoan rugby union
2014 in Tongan rugby union